Smiley face killer may refer to:

Keith Hunter Jesperson (born 1955), serial killer who used the smiley face symbol on his letters to the police and prosecutors
Robert Lee Yates (born 1952), serial killer who used plastic bags with a smiley face printed on them to cover the heads of his victims
Smiley face murder theory, a theory about smiley faces near the bodies of young men killed by drowning between 1992 and 2018
Smiley Face Killers (film), a 2020 American slasher film

See also
Red John#Smiley face and other signatures